P. K. Joseph was an Indian film director in Malayalam movies. He had directed 16 Malayalam movies. He died in 1990.

Filmography

Direction
 Kallu Kaarthyaayani (1979)
 Sukhathinte Pinnale (1979)
 Pennorumbettaal (1979)
 Makaravilakku (1980)
 Oothikkaachiya Ponnu (1981)
 Kayam (1982)
 Ente Kadha (1983)
 Kaathirunna Divasam (1983)
 Oru Mukham Pala Mukham (1983)
 Manassoru Mahaasamudram (1983)
 Oru Thettinte Katha -  (1984)
 Kooduthedunna Parava (1984)
 Snehicha Kuttathinu (1985)
 Mulamoottil Adima (1985)
 Vida Parayaan Maathram (1988)
 Rahasyam Paramarahasyam (1988)

Story
 Sukhathinte Pinnale (1979)
 Pennorumbettaal (1979)
 Kooduthedunna Parava (1984)

Dialogue
 Pennorumbettaal (1979)
 Kooduthedunna Parava (1984)

Screenplay
 Kallu Kaarthyaayani (1979)
 Sukhathinte Pinnale (1979)

Acting
 Chandrakaantham (1974)

References

External links

Malayalam film directors
Malayalam screenwriters
1990 deaths
Date of birth missing
Film directors from Thiruvananthapuram
20th-century Indian dramatists and playwrights
20th-century Indian film directors
Screenwriters from Thiruvananthapuram
20th-century Indian screenwriters